The Montreal Daily News was a short-lived English language Canadian daily newspaper in Quebec. Quebecor founder Pierre Péladeau and British tabloid publisher Robert Maxwell teamed up to launch a competing English-language newspaper against The Gazette. The newspaper was published in a tabloid sized format, instead of broadsheet sized.

Its first issue was distributed 15 March 1988.

The arrival of the paper resulted in the return of Sunday editions to Montreal's English language  newspaper community for the first time since the closure of the Sunday Express in 1985. In order to compete against the Montreal Daily News''' Sunday edition, the Montreal Gazette started to publish one as well.

But late in 1989, reports of losses and failure to attain circulation goals led to rumours of the paper's impending demise. In November that year, Péladeau indicated that the paper's survival would depend on either a substantial increase in paid circulation, or a buyer. Original publisher George MacLaren had given way to James Duff, who in turn was dismissed in August. Quebecor finally closed the Montreal Daily News, with its last issue published 15 December 1989.

The legacy of the Montreal Daily News is the existence for some time of Sunday editions in Montreal, now past except for Le Journal de Montreal.

See also
List of Quebec media
List of newspapers in Canada

Montreal newspapers:
 The Gazette La Presse Le Journal de Montréal Le Devoir The Montreal Star (defunct)''

References

Publications established in 1988
Publications disestablished in 1989
Defunct newspapers published in Quebec
Newspapers published in Montreal
English-language newspapers published in Quebec
Daily newspapers published in Quebec
1988 establishments in Quebec
1989 disestablishments in Quebec